Merrion, Merion, or Meirion may refer to:

Places
United States:
 Merion, Pennsylvania
 Merion Village, Columbus, Ohio

Wales:
 Merrion, Pembrokeshire
 Merionethshire
 Meirionnydd

Merrion Estate, Dublin, Ireland:
 Merrion Gates
 Merrion Road
 Merrion Square
 Merrion Street
 Mount Merrion

People
 Meirion, father of Caradog ap Meirion, King of Gwynedd (reigned 754? – 798)
 Mem Fox (Merrion Frances Partridge, b.1946), Australian children's author

Other
 SS Merion, 1902 ocean liner
 Merrion Centre (disambiguation)
 Merion Golf Club, Merion, Pennsylvania
 Merion Cricket Club, Merion, Pennsylvania
 Merrion Cricket Club, Dublin, Ireland

See also
 Merian (disambiguation)
 Meriones (disambiguation)
 Marion (disambiguation)
 Portmeirion, Wales